Urcuchillay was a god worshiped by Incan herders, believed to be a llama who watched over animals. It was attributed to the constellation Canis Major.

See also
Inca mythology

References

Inca gods
Animal gods
Stellar gods